Amalie Mathilde Bauerle (12 November 1873 – 4 March 1916), known as Amelia Bauerle, was a British painter, illustrator and etcher. She also used the name Amelia Matilda Bowerley.

Life
Bauerle was born in the Bayswater area of London, the daughter of the German artist Karl Wilhelm Bauerle, and studied at the South Kensington School of Art and the Slade School of Fine Art before travelling in Italy and Germany. She exhibited paintings at the Royal Academy from 1897 until her death, and also exhibited  in Paris and America. She contributed illustrations — typically art nouveau in style — to the Yellow Book. In the 1911 Census, she was living at a boarding house in Langhorne Gardens, Folkestone. Her occupation was artist and she was single.

Exhibitions and catalogues 
 Catalogue of a series of water colours and etchings: When the world was young''' by Amelia M. Bauerlé. London: Dowdeswell Galleries, 1908.

 Selected book illustrations 
 W. E. Cule, Sir Constant: Knight of the Great King. Andrew Melrose, London, 1899.
 Frederic William Farrar  Allegories. Longmans & Co., London, 1898.
 Alfred Tennyson.  The Day-Dream (poem) In: Flowers of Parnassus. vol. 7. [1900, etc.] 8º.
 Ismay Thorn. Happy-go-lucky.  Roseleaf Library, London, 1894.

 Selected paintings 
 Goblin Harvest c.1910
 Ophelia

 See also 
 John Lane. The Yellow Book, An Illustrated Quarterly'', London, April 1897.

References 
 Amelia Bauerle
 Karl Wilhelm Bauerle (German Wikipedia)

1873 births
1916 deaths
19th-century English painters
20th-century English painters
19th-century English women artists
20th-century English women artists
Alumni of the Slade School of Fine Art
Art Nouveau illustrators
Art Nouveau painters
English illustrators
English people of German descent
Painters from London